The sixth edition of the Queen Elisabeth Music Competition took place in 1955 and was the third one devoted to violin. The Soviet violin school couldn't attain a third victory after the successes of David Oistrakh in 1937 and Leonid Kogan in 1951 as Berl Senofsky managed to beat Julian Sitkovetsky. Senofsky remains the only American who has won the violin competition to date.

Palmares

Jury
  Necil Kazim Akses
  Yvonne Astruc
  Oskar Back
  Marcel Cuvelier (chairman)
  Désiré Defauw
  Zino Francescatti
  Sadanori Maki
  Yehudi Menuhin
  Philip Newman
  Ricardo Odnoposoff
  David Oistrakh
  Alfred Pochon
  Maurice Raskin

References
  Queen Elisabeth Music Competition

06
1955 in Belgium